This is a list of the Republican French heads of state who have not held the title "President of the Republic" since the final fall of House of Capet in 1848, as sorted by length of service.

List

References

France
Presidents
Presidents

de:Liste der Staatsoberhäupter Frankreichs#Zweite Republik